CenturyTel of South Arkansas, Inc. is a telephone operating company of CenturyLink providing local telephone services to Dodge City and Junction City in Arkansas and South Dodge City and South Junction City in Louisiana

The company was founded in 1961 as the Union Telephone Company, Inc. Clarke Williams acquired the company, along with what is now CenturyTel of Arkansas, in 1962, later becoming part of his company Central Telephone and Electronics, then Century Telephone Enterprises. The Union Telephone Company, in 1995, became Century Telephone of South Arkansas, Inc. The company adopted its current name in 1998.

References

Lumen Technologies
American companies established in 1961
Communications in Arkansas
Telecommunications companies of the United States
Telecommunications companies established in 1961
1961 establishments in Arkansas